One on One is the debut studio album by musician Mira Calix. It was released on 6 March 2000 by Warp.

Critical reception

Matt LeMay of Pitchfork called One on One "an album of alienation, desolation, emptiness, and uneasiness." In 2017, Pitchfork placed One on One at number 47 on its list of the best IDM albums of all time.

Track listing

References

External links
 

2000 debut albums
Mira Calix albums
Warp (record label) albums